Dormaa East is a parliamentary constituency in the Bono Region of Ghana. Yaw Ntow Ababio is the member of parliament for the constituency. He was elected on the ticket of the New Patriotic Party (NPP) won a majority of 4,898 votes to become the MP. He had also represented the constituency in the 4th Republic parliament.

See also
List of Ghana Parliament constituencies

References 

Parliamentary constituencies in the Bono Region